Qila Raipur Sports Festival, popularly known as the Rural Olympics, is held annually in Qila Raipur (near Ludhiana), in Punjab, India. Competitions are held for major Punjabi rural sports, include cart-race, athletic events and rope pulling.

In February each year, Ludhiana becomes the destination for hundreds of sports enthusiasts, including foreigners. They come to Qila Raipur to see the special breed of bullocks, camels, dogs, mules and other animals competing in competitive events. The most prestigious winners have attended. In the year of the Olympics 2008, Hakam and Naib Singh Nagrath from village Kalsian, Punjab took the 1st place prize. They also won first in gujjaral and phalewal. They are known in Punjab as the men who hold the greatest passion in the sport.

Ban on bull racing 

In 2014, the supreme court of Indian banned the Bull racing event after the complains of animal cruelty. The petition was filed in 2012 by a Gau Raksha Dal—an organisation that works for the protection of cows and other animals registered a petition against the use of bulls in these games. The Punjab and Haryana high court combined the petition with two others, one by the Malwa Doaba Bulls Welfare Association and another by the Rural Hult Race and Welfare Association, both of which claimed that the Qila Raipur races did not constitute a violation of Section 11 of the Prevention of Cruelty act, as the races did not qualify as performance or exhibition. The court ruled in favour of these two petitions and allowed the races. The presiding judge observed, "At the cost of repetition, it is observed that the Bulls, which are being used for the sports, are well looked after, well nourished and are not treated with any cruelty." This remained intact, until the 2014 Supreme Court order.

Other rural sports in Punjab with cultural and social importance 

In villages which formed the first habitation of civilised man rural sports grew out of sheer necessity. The need for cultivating individual strength for labour on the fields, the interdependence within the community and need of defence, joint defence against onslaughts of a common foe and dangerous animals must have given birth to sports like wrestling, running, jumping, weightlifting and such performing arts as of measuring strength by holding wrists, twisting hands. Kabaddi which is another expression of the same spirit has become the mother of games in Punjab.

In order to toughen the frames and steel the minds of his followers Guru Hargobindji had started the tradition of holding wrestling bouts within the precincts of Akal Takht Sahib and it is mostly because of the fillip that he gave and the seal of ethics that he put on them that sports become a proud facet of life in Punjab. On the common grounds of villages, in the fairs, during the festivals, at the hermitages of pirs, graves of preceptors, wrestling became a part of high recreation. Villages adopt and feed wrestlers and also give prizes to them as a matter of honour in Punjab today.

During the Hola Mohalla celebrations at Anandpur Sahib tent pegging competitions, archery, fencing and riding competitions, gymnastic and acrobatic displays which the Nihangs put up and the tournaments held at Diwali have a hoary history. To the Punjabis goes the distinction of organising rural games into tournaments.

Almost sixty years ago when the Grewal Sports Association had begun to hold competitions in rural sports at Village Quilla Raipur little would have anyone thought that this tournament will become a movement in Punjab.

Today in almost 7000 villages in Punjab in one decade or the other rural sports competitions are being held. Rural folk organise them. It is they who extend all hospitality to the competitors also. In fact these village sports have opened the floodgates of village development.

Before Independence in 1947 major importance was given only to Kabaddi and wrestling, after Independence the circle of rural sports also got widened. The rustic "Khido Khoondi" (literally a ball made out of cuttings of cloth and a stick twisted at the end like a flat hockey blade) was replaced by proper hockey and players from villages, having no facilities beyond uneven grounds to play began to dominate in the game. Twelve of our country's greatest hockey players have come out of a single village called Sansapur in Jalandhar District.
Recently not only revival of sports fairs has taken place in Punjab but their number has also increased tremendously. Twenty years ago, for instance, their number was limited to

 Babehali-di-Chhinj
 Bhaggowal-di-Chhinj
 Shikar-Macchian di-Parewi
 Jaura-Chhatra-di-Parewi
 Bhomey-Wadaley-di-Chhinj
 Quilla Raipur's sports
 Shanker-di-Chhinj
 Manann-haaney-di-Chhinj etc.

Now sports meets are held almost in every significant village in Punjab.

Following the Qila Raipur Rural Sports meet the Kalgidhar Tournament of Kamalpur has also completed half-a-century. Dhudike's Lala Lajpat Rai Memorial Sports Fair has completed three decades. Gujarwal, Mullanpur, Sahnewal, Ghungali Rajputtana Hambla., Dhamto are flourishing. The -small sports meets of Lalto Kalan, Dhurkot, Rauni, Dyalpur, Rurka Kalan, Bhinder Kalan, Duare-ana are gaining stature day by day.

Three types of competitions are held during rural meets, Purely rural games : Kabaddi, Wrestling, Weight-lifting etc. Modern sports like athletics, hockey, football, volleyball, cycling, handball etc. Performing sports like acrobatics, twisting an iron-rod by placing it on Adam's apple, passing tractor over the rib-ease, cracking a big stone by placing it on the chest etc. Now another colour is also being added to these sports fairs. They have got intermixed with folk singing when sun sets after the days sports competitions the notes of music begin to emanate and singing continues, sometimes, late in the night. Music contest that was held between Karamjit Dhuri and Jagmohan Kaur at Qila Raipur is still fondly remembered. At the Gujarwal Meet the singing of Parminder Sandhu, Hans Raj Hans and Surinder Chhinda and at fairs of Majha region the notes o Toombi (one-stringed instrument) of Amarjit remain fixed in the minds of the people.

Villagers are not just fond of their own competitions they also like to size-up the skill and power of their animals like bulls, horses, dogs on the sports ground. Bullockcart racing has become a passion in Punjab. Because of a ban on hunting, hound-races are held in Punjab by dangling a bait of fake hare before them. At places cock-fights are also held and pigeon fights are contested. In some parts of Punjab people indulge in fighting a bull by barehands.

Rural Sports are a personification of the virility of Punjab.

Other games

Tirinjen 

One of the popular organized forms of work and entertainment for young girls is Tirinjen – where the girls spin and sing. Tirinjen is a kind of social club, which can be organized in any home, where place for spinning wheels and the girls is available for a day/night. The girls would sing and dance, would express their sorrow and happiness, pangs of separation and joy of meeting. The spinning wheel plays a significant role in the life of the women, as a companion, counselor in distress, friend and guide. An example of a song sung by a married girl during Tirinjen:

  Charkha mera rangla, vich sone dian mekhan,
  Ni mai tenu yaad karan, jad charkhe wal dekhan.
  My spinning wheel is multi colored
  Inlaid with nails of gold,
  I think of you
  Whenever I see my spinning wheel.
  Har charkhe de gere
  Yad awen toon mitra
  Each circle of the wheel,
  Brings your sweet memories to my mind.

Teej or Teeans, which is celebrated in the month of Sawan (July), is also a source of entertainment for girls. Teej festival starts on the third day of Sawan and continues for about thirteen days. This is a period when rainy season is at its best, having said good bye to the scorching heat, people are out to enjoy the rains. It is also the time for sowing. The whole atmosphere is relaxed and people have a sigh of relief. The girls celebrate it by having swings. One sees girls, even today, on the swings all over the villages during the rainy season. They have new clothes, special dishes to eat and special songs for the occasion. This festival has also made inroads into the urban society. A number of songs are sung during the occasion pertaining to various aspects of the social life.

  Ral auo sahio ni,
  Sabh tian khedan jaiye
  Hun aya sawan ni
  Pinghan piplin ja ke paiye
  Pai ku ku kardi ni,
  Sahio koel Hanju dolhe
  Papiha wekho ni,
  Bherha pee-pee kar ke bole.
  Paye pailan pande ni,
  Bagi moran shor machaya.
  Arhio khil khil phaulan ne,
  Sanu mahia yad kariya.

In English:
  Come on all friends!
  Let’s go and play Tian,
  The Sawan Heartens us,
  Let us hang the swings on the Peepal.
  Swinging ku-ku O friends!
  The cuckoo sheds its tears
  And behold this Papiha
  Which goes on singing pia-pia.
  The peacock dances gleefully
  Filling the garden with its crowings
  These wretched blossoming flowers
  Remind us of our Ranjan.

Kikli 

This is another game, basically for women. Two girls clasp their hands and move in circle. This was a game, which was played by two or four girls and multiple of two thereof.
Kikli kleer di,
Pag mere vir de,
Daupatta mere bhai da
Phitte mun jawai da

Gheeta Pathar 

Some pebbles, stones or broken earthenware could be broken further into pieces and used for playing Gheeta Pather. This was a game, which did not involve running or jumping and was played sitting on the floor.

Khidu 

The girls would sing along with Khidu (Ball), in fact these rhymes and game is suitable for the children: This was for the first round, there was the second and third till the end was reached by counting ten and singing the tenth song.

Kokla Chhapaki 

This game is popular even today amongst the children. Both boys and girls play it. Children sit in a circles and a child who has cloth in hand goes around the circle-singing: It is a kind of warning for the children sitting in a circle not to look back. The cloth is then dropped at the back of a child. If it is discovered before the child who had placed it there had completed the round, the child who discovered the cloth would run after him and try to touch him with it till he sits in the place vacated by the one who had discovered the cloth.

Chicho Chich Ganerian 

This game is for both boys and girls. It is generally played by two teams and involves drawing as many vertical lines as possible.

Lukan Miti (hide and seek) 

This was also played by both boys and girls and continues to this day. Two teams can also play this. One has to hide, the other has to seek but before doing it a call is given.

Kidi Kada or Stapoo 

This is a game played both by the girls and boys. It is still common amongst some of the children. This game is played with in small boundary (court), drawn on the ground and a piece of stone.

Ghaggar Phissi 

This is another game for the boys. One boy would bend and the other boys, may be one or two or three get on top of him, if he could bear the weight, he would win. In case he could not bear the weight and fell, he would lose.

Kabbadi 

This game is popular even today and is played now by both boys and girls. This was included in the Asian Games also and is popular all over south Asia. The game is played between two teams. A line is drawn between the two teams and each team would send a player across the line. If the player after crossing the line is able to touch a player of the opposite side and came back without being caught, the team doing so would win and a point was added to its score. This process by the player crossing the line has to be performed in a single breath. The team with higher score would be the winner
is also known as achi game

Rasa Kashi (tug of war) 

The men generally played this game. These days women also participate in the game which is played by FIVE teams. A line is drawn between the two teams, each having one end of the rope in its hands. The team, which is able to drag the other team to its side, is the winner team.

Akharas 

These were very popular. Located near the well outside the village, sometimes near the temple. These were the places where the boys learnt wrestling from a Guru or Pehlwan-Wrestler.

Martial art 

This was also a part of the teaching in Akharas, where the boys learnt the use of weapons. Nihangs practice martial arts to keep up the traditions.

Kite Flying (Patang Bazi) 

It is now very much an urbanized game and is popular with the rural folks as well. It has now assumed an International character.
Besides the games mentioned above, Chaupat, Shatranj (Chess), camel and bullockcart races, cock fights in addition to Kabutar bazi, chakore bazi and bater bazi are well known.
LATTOO ( yo-yo), played mostly by the boys.

Guli Danda (Lippa) 

Gilli-danda Guli Danda is an amateur sport, popular among rural youth in  the Indian subcontinent. It is called dÄnggÅ±li in Bangla, chinni-dandu in Kannada, kuttiyum kolum in Malayalam, viti-dandu in Marathi, kitti-pullu in Tamil, gooti-billa in Telugu, and Lappa-Duggi in Pashto. This sport is generally played in the rural and small towns of the Indian subcontinent. It is widely played in Punjab and rural areas of the North-West Frontier Province and Sindh (Pakistan) and Sultanpur district, Uttar Pradesh (north India).

Origin 

There are no records of the game's origin in the south Asian subcontinent or of its existence before the arrival of Europeans. However a similar game known as Lippa has a history of being played in Italy and southern Europe.

Equipment 

Gilli-danda have no official requirements for equipment. The game is played with a gilli or guli and danda, which are both wooden sticks. The danda is longer and handmade by the player, who can swing it easily.
The gilli is smaller and is tapered on both sides so that the ends are conical. The gilli is analogous to a cricket ball and the danda is analogous to a cricket bat.
There is no standard length defined for the danda or gilli. Usually, however, the gilli is 3 to 6 inches long and the danda is 12 to 18 inches.

Rules 

The objective of the sport is to use the danda like a baseball bat to strike the gilli (similar to striking a ball in cricket or baseball). For this purpose, a circle is drawn in the ground in which a small, oblong- or spindle-shaped hole is dug (the overall shape looks like a traditional boat). This hole is smaller than the gilli but as the play progresses the size may increase due to wear. The gilli is inserted into the hole either orthogonally, or at an angle. The danda is then swung (similar to a golf swing) and strikes the gilli. Another variation is when the danda lifts or pries the gilli out of the hole at a high speed. As it is quite similar to cricket, many people believe that cricket originated from it.
Scoring and outs
There are many regional variations to scoring.
The gilli becomes airborne after it is struck. If a fielder from the opposing team catches the gilli, the striker is out. If the gilli lands on the ground, the fielder closest to the gilli has one chance to hit the danda (which has to be placed on top of the hole used) with a throw (similar to a run out in cricket). If the fielder is successful, the striker is out; if not, the striker scores one score and gets another opportunity to strike. The team (or individual) with the most points wins the game. If the striker fails
to hit gilli in three tries, the striker is out (similar to a strikeout in baseball).
Teams
There is no official maximum number of players or teams. Gilli-danda can be played where each individual plays for themselves, or between two teams.

Champions 

So far, very few International tournaments played between India & Pakistan. Pakistan defeated India in three out of five; two ended in a draw. The Pakistani Champions were: Noor Khan, Abdul Hameed Qureshi, Nadeem Jameel, Iftikhar Hashmi, and
Qaseem Siddiqui.
The Indian Champions: Deepali Gode from Kalyan, Varun, Ajay Kaushik, Rohit Mishra (allahabad)(engineer from IT BHU), Vijay Choudhary of Darbhanga, Vivek Baranwal of Varanasi, Upender Kumar, Satyendra Tripathi, and Sandeep Prakash and Pradeep Kumar yYdav of Lucknow Sudhanshu Yadav from Jaipur

Variations 

As an amateur youth sport, gilli-danda has many variations. A common variation is where the striker is allowed to hit the gilli twice, once initially, and then while the gilli is in the air.
In some versions, the points a striker scores is dependent on the distance the gilli falls from the striking point. The distance is measured in term
s of the length of the danda, or in some cases the length of the gilli. Scoring also depends on how many times the gilli was hit in the air in one strike. If it travels a certain distance with two mid-air strikes, the total point is doubled.
In the Philippines, a game known as syatong is similar to gilli-danda.
In Italy a similar game known as "Lippa", "Lipe", "Tirolo", or "S-cianco" is shown in the movie Watch Out We Are Mad.

References

Further reading
 The Times of India
 The Indian Express
 The New Indian Express
 Vice
 The Huffington Post
 The Indian Express
 Daily News & Analysis
 Travelers Today
 Time (short article)
 The National
 Daily Passenger Travel Blog

External links 

 Students from University Of Limerick website

Multi-sport events in India
Cultural festivals in India
Sport in Punjab, India
Punjabi culture
Sports festivals in India